Canterbury was one of fourteen teams who took part in the 2008 Air New Zealand Cup.  At the start of the season Canterbury had yet to win the top-flight New Zealand rugby competition since its change in format, though it had won the 2004 National Provincial Championship and had held the Ranfurly Shield last in 2007.  This was the thirty-third consecutive year Canterbury participated at the highest level of provincial rugby, having been at this level every year since the league system was instituted in 1976.

2008 Squad
The 2008 Air New Zealand Cup squad was announced at the conclusion of the pre-season.  The 2008 squad included twelve players new to the Canterbury first team (indicated by an asterisk).  The captaincy went to Kieran Read, taking over from previous captain Corey Flynn who, while in the squad came into the season uncertain of a start due to injury while playing for the Crusaders.

Coach 
Rob Penney

Forwards 
Wyatt Crockett, Ben Franks (on loan to Tasman), Owen Franks*, Corey Flynn, Ti'i Paulo, Steve Fualau, Campbell Johnstone, Peter Borlase*, Michael Paterson, Isaac Ross, James Broadhurst* (2007 Canterbury Colts and Canterbury B), Kieran Read (Captain), Nasi Manu, Hayden Hopgood, George Whitelock* (Otago), Mose Tuiali'i, Richard Wheeler.

Backs
Tyson Keats, Steve Alfeld* (2007 Canterbury Colts and Canterbury B), Stephen Brett, Hamish Gard, Colin Slade* (2007 Canterbury Colts and New Zealand Universities), Tim Bateman, Phil Burleigh* (2007 Canterbury Colts and Canterbury B), Ryan Crotty*, Kosuke Endo* (Japan), Casey Laulala, Adam Whitelock* (2007 Canterbury Colts), James Paterson* (2007 Canterbury Colts), Sean Maitland, Scott Hamilton,  Paul Williams (Vice Captain).

Unavailable players
The following Canterbury players were unavailable through the season due to All Blacks duty: Greg Somerville, Richie McCaw, Andy Ellis, Dan Carter and Leon MacDonald.

Canterbury lost the services of the following players from the 2007 squad due to retirement or transfer: Johnny Leo'o to Japan, Aaron Mauger to Leicester Tigers (England), Caleb Ralph to Fukuoka Sanix Blues (Japan), Reuben Thorne to Yamaha Jubilo (Japan), Kevin O'Neill to Waikato and Kevin Senio to Castres Olympique (France) (Rico Gear who left to play for Worcester Warriors (England) was a loan player from Tasman).  Campbell Johnstone left halfway through the season.

Pre-season

Sevens
Canterbury took part in the provincial sevens tournament at Queenstown with team captained by Steven Yates.  Day one saw Canterbury go undefeated with wins over the West Coast 42-0, Wellington 20-10 and North Harbour 27-5.  Two losses on day two however saw Canterbury eliminated early on.  They were defeated in a close game with southern rivals Otago 17-19 and then fell to perennial sevens stalwart Bay of Plenty 26-29.

Captain Steven Yates headed the try-scoring with five touchdowns while Nick McCashin top-scored with 32 points.

Canterbury 2008 sevens squad: Steven Yates (five tries), Ben Nowell (three tries), Mikaele Tuu'u, Julian Poff (one try), Wane Seru, Ryan Hooper, Nick Thomson (three tries), Jacob Stevens (four tries), Willy Heinz (two tries), Nick McCashin (two tries, eleven conversions), Lloyd Carter (two tries), Pisi Napolioni.

Warm-up matches
Canterbury's build-up consisted of three matches against Crusaders stablemate Tasman, Southland and Wellington.  None of these games were afforded first-class status by Canterbury, although this does not preclude the fact that their opponents in these matches my have awarded provincial caps.

Tasman defeated Cantebury at the small North Canterbury township of Omihi 19-31.  This game was played in four twenty-minute quarters and featured few first choice players from the previous season.  Canterbury then defeated Southland at Rugby Park Invercargill 24-14.  The final pre-season game was a defeat to Wellington at Porirua Park 12-20.  This game resulted in the unfortunate injury of back-line veteran Casey Laulala who suffered an arm fracture.

Regular season

Highlights
 Ti'i Paulo played his blazer game (twelfth) for the province when he ran on against Auckland.
 The following players made their first class debuts for Canterbury during the 2008 season: Adam Whitelock, James Paterson, James Broadhurst, Sam Whitelock, Kosuke Endo, Colin Slade, Steve Alfeld, George Whitelock, Owen Franks, Paul Borlase.
 Following their first round loss to Manawatu, Canterbury's run of twelve consecutive wins constituted the best winning sequence in their Air New Zealand Cup history, it was also the second best one-season run in all Air New Zealand Cups to Auckland's perfect season in 2007.  As Auckland lost their last game of the 2006 season (to Wellington) and the first game of the 2008 season (to Counties) should Canterbury win their opening two rounds of the 2009 season they will have the record for the longest winning run in the competition history.

Round 1

Round 2

Round 3

Round 4

Round 5

Round 6

This was prop Campbell Johnstone's final game for the province and was given the honour of leading his team onto the field.  He earned 69 provincial caps for canterbury in a career that started in 2002 against Marlborough.  Johnstone finished with a combined 105 first class appearances for Canterbury and the Crusaders, and three test caps.  Steven Brett was selected for the run on side at first five, in what would have been his first game back at top class rugby since injury in the Super 14, but was stood down in favour of Colin Slade.  This was the lowest attendance to watch a Canterbury side this season and coincidentally was North Harbour's highest home gate.

Round 7

Entering this match Northland had failed to win a match since the opening round victory over Waikato while Canterbury had byreflection kept a blemish free campaign since their opening round lost to Manawatu.  Northland had not beaten Canterbury since 1999.  The expectation was that Canterbury would have little trouble overcoming the Taniwha in what is thought to be their last first class meeting before Northland is demoted to the Heartland Cup.  Against expectation Northland proved to be a stern opponent and matched Canterbury in their defensive prowess in a game that after the first twenty-three minutes was scoreless.  The game marked the return of Andy Ellis and Steven Brett from injury.

Round 8

Canterbury ran out convincing winners over a Bay of Plenty team that had shared the top of the table with Wellington three weeks before.  After Canterbury's near miss against Northland the previous week Bay of Plenty went to Christchurch believing a win was within their grasp.  For both teams home quarter-finals were still very much on the line, but Canterbury took their eighth consecutive victory against the Steamers.  Brett, who had returned to the team the previous week, this week took over the goal kicking duties from newcomer Colin Slade.  He returned a mixed bag missing four of seven shots.

Round 9

Corey Flynn played his first game in Canterbury colours this year when he was subbed on for Ti'i Paulo late in the game, he had been convalescing since breaking his arm playing for the Crusaders against the Hurricanes in the Super 14 semi-final earlier in the year.  Hawke's Bay were chasing a home quarterfinal spot going into this game and went ahead early, that would prove to be the last time they would trouble the scorers.  Canterbury scored 31 unanswered points, based around an impregnable defensive effort after their early lapse.  Stephen Brett showed a return to form with the boot kicking all his conversions and landing a rare drop goal.  Canterbury secured a bonus point on the full-time hooter and ensured that they would finish second on the table to Wellington regardless of the results in round 10.

Round 10

Southland's final home game of the season saw them still chasing a possible top four place, while Canterbury were destined to take second regardless of the result.  However Canterbury's rock solid defence (the best in the competition after ten weeks) kept the Stags out of the game from the start.  Even the 13-0 half time score looked like a match winner.  Slade regained his starting place as first five and kicking duties due to Steven Brett's recurring leg injury.  Casey Laulala made his first appearance of the season following breaking his arm against Wellington.  Mose Tuiali'i however saw his Canterbury career end on a low note by being knocked out cold in a freak lineout clash with teammate Isaac Ross - ironically Tuiali'i had been benched for most of the game in order to save one of the team's stars of the season for the play-offs.

Play-offs

Quarter-final

Tasman hung in to this game as long as they could but the previous two weeks heroics that saw them almost take the Ranfurly Shield off Wellington and then flatten Manawatu could not be repeated against their Crusader stablemates.  The Canterbury backline was especially potent with attacking options being in evidence from 9 to 15.

Semi-final

Richie McCaw made his first provincial start for two years bolstering Canterbury who were one win away from a first final appearance since 2004.  A clear and windless night beckoned good omens for running rugby and between them the two sides scored seven tries in a match that will be remembered more for the strong almost vicious contest for the ball.  Inspirational Hawkes Bay captain and stalwart left the field and his career after being knocked out cold defending a certain try.  On the other side Slade continued his good season with a 16-point haul to take him to second on the scoring chart for the season.  This game marked the final home games for Scott Hamilton and Greg Somerville.

Player statistics

Points Scorers

Current to the end of the semi-final

Try Scorers

Current to the semi-final

See also 
2008 Air New Zealand Cup

References

External links 
 

2008 Air New Zealand Cup